In the field of extractive metallurgy, mineral processing is the process of separating commercially valuable minerals from their ores. Depending on the processes used in each instance, it is often also known as ore dressing or ore milling.

History 

Before the advent of heavy machinery the raw ore was broken up using hammers wielded by hand, a process called "spalling". Before long, mechanical means were found to achieve this. For instance, stamp mills were used in Samarkand as early as 973. They were also in use in medieval Persia. By the 11th century, stamp mills were in widespread use throughout the medieval Islamic world, from Islamic Spain and North Africa in the west to Central Asia in the east. A later example was the Cornish stamps, consisting of a series of iron hammers mounted in a vertical frame, raised by cams on the shaft of a waterwheel and falling onto the ore under gravity.

The simplest method of separating ore from gangue consists of picking out the individual crystals of each. This is a very tedious process, particularly when the individual particles are small. Another comparatively simple method relies on the various minerals having different densities, causing them to collect in different places: metallic minerals (being heavier) will drop out of suspension more quickly than lighter ones, which will be carried further by a stream of water. The process of panning and sifting for gold uses both of these methods. Various devices known as 'bundles' were used to take advantage of this property. Later, more advanced machines were used such as the Frue vanner, invented in 1874.

Other equipment used historically includes the hutch, a trough used with some ore-dressing machines and the keeve or kieve, a large tub used for differential settlement.

Unit operations
Mineral processing can involve four general types of unit operation: comminution – particle size reduction; sizing – separation of particle sizes by screening or classification; concentration by taking advantage of physical and surface chemical properties; and dewatering – solid/liquid separation. In all of these processes, the most important considerations are the economics of the processes, which is dictated by the grade and recovery of the final product. To do this, the mineralogy of the ore needs to be considered as this dictates the amount of liberation required and the processes that can occur. The smaller the particles processes, the greater the theoretical grade and recovery of the final product, but this is difficult to do with fine particles since they prevent certain concentration processes from occurring.

Comminution
Comminution is particle size reduction of materials. Comminution may be carried out on either dry materials or slurries. Crushing and grinding are the two primary comminution processes. Crushing is normally carried out on "run-of-mine" ore, while grinding (normally carried out after crushing) may be conducted on dry or slurried material. In comminution, the size reduction of particles is done by three types of forces: compression, impact and attrition. Compression and impact forces are extensively used in crushing operations while attrition is the dominant force in grinding. The primarily used equipment in crushing are jaw crushers, gyratory crushers and cone crushers whereas rod mills and ball mills, usually closed circuited with a classifier unit, are generally employed for grinding purposes in a mineral processing plant. Crushing is a dry process whereas grinding is generally performed wet and hence is more energy intensive.

Sizing

Sizing is the general term for separation of particles according to their size.

The simplest sizing process is screening, or passing the particles to be sized through a screen or number of screens. Screening equipment can include grizzlies, bar screens, wedge wire screens, radial sieves, banana screens, multi-deck screens, vibratory screen, fine screens, flip flop screens, and wire mesh screens. Screens can be static (typically the case for very coarse material), or they can incorporate mechanisms to shake or vibrate the screen. Some considerations in this process include the screen material, the aperture size, shape and orientation, the amount of near sized particles, the addition of water, the amplitude and frequency of the vibrations, the angle of inclination, the presence of harmful materials, like steel and wood, and the size distribution of the particles.

Classification refers to sizing operations that exploit the differences in settling velocities exhibited by particles of different size. Classification equipment may include ore sorters, gas cyclones, hydrocyclones, rotating trommels, rake classifiers or fluidized classifiers.

An important factor in both comminution and sizing operations is the determination of the particle size distribution of the materials being processed, commonly referred to as particle size analysis. Many techniques for analyzing particle size are used, and the techniques include both off-line analyses which require that a sample of the material be taken for analysis and on-line techniques that allow for analysis of the material as it flows through the process.

Concentration
There are a number of ways to increase the concentration of the wanted minerals: in any particular case, the method chosen will depend on the relative physical and surface chemical properties of the mineral and the gangue.
Concentration is defined as the number of moles of a solute in a volume of the solution. In case of mineral processing, concentration means the increase of the percentage of the valuable mineral in the concentrate.

Gravity concentration
Gravity separation is the separation of two or more minerals of different specific gravity by their relative movement in response to the force of gravity and one or more other forces (such as centrifugal forces, magnetic forces, buoyant forces), one of which is resistance to motion (drag force) by a viscous medium such as heavy media, water or, less commonly, air.

Gravity separation is one of the oldest technique in mineral processing but has seen a decline in its use since the introduction of methods like flotation, classification, magnetic separation and leaching. Gravity separation dates back to at least 3000 BC when Egyptians used the technique for separation of gold.

It is necessary to determine the suitability of a gravity concentration process before it is employed for concentration of an ore. The concentration criterion is commonly used for this purpose, designated  in the following equation (where  represents specific gravity):

for CC > 2.5, suitable for separation of particles above 75 micron in size
for 1.75 < CC < 2.5, suitable for separation of particles above 150 micron in size
for 1.50 < CC < 1.75, suitable for separation of particles above 1.7 mm in size
for 1.25 < CC < 1.50, suitable for separation of particles above 6.35 mm in size
for CC < 1.25, not suitable for any size

Although concentration criteria is a useful rule of thumb when predicting amenability to gravity concentration, factors such as particle shape and relative concentration of heavy and light particles can dramatically affect separation efficiency in practice.

 Classification
There are several methods that make use of the weight or density differences of particles: 
 Heavy media or dense media separation (these include baths, drums, larcodems, dyana whirlpool separators, and dense medium cyclones)
 Shaking tables, such as the Wilfley table
 Spiral separators
 Reflux Classifier
 Jig concentrators are continuous processing gravity concentration devices using a pulsating fluidized bed.(RMS-Ross Corp. Circular Jig Plants)
 Centrifugal bowl concentrators, such as the Knelson concentrator
 Multi gravity separators including Knelson, Mozley (Multi or Enhanced) Gravity Separator, Salter Cyclones (Multi-Gravity Separator) and the Kelsey Jig)
 Inline pressure Jigs
 Reichert Cones
 Sluices
 Elutriators

These processes can be classified as either density separation or gravity (weight) separation.

In dense media separation a media is created with a density in between the density of the ore and gangue particles. When subjected to this media particles either float or sink depending on their density relative to the media. In this way the separation takes place purely on density differences and does not, in principle, relay on any other factors such as particle weight or shape. In practice, particle size and shape can affect separation efficiency. Dense medium separation can be performed using a variety of mediums. These include, organic liquids, aqueous solutions or suspensions of very fine particles in water or air. The organic liquids are typically not used due to their toxicity, difficulties in handling and relative cost. Industrially, the most common dense media is a suspension of fine magnetite and/or ferrosilicon particles. An aqueous solution as a dense medium is used in coal processing in the form of a belknap wash and suspensions in air are used in water-deficient areas, like areas of China, where sand is used to separate coal from the gangue minerals.

Gravity separation is also called relative gravity separation as it separates particles due to their relative response to a driving force. This is controlled by factors such as particle weight, size and shape. These processes can also be classified into multi-G and single G processes. The difference is the magnitude of the driving force for the separation. Multi-G processes allow the separation of very fine particles to occur (in the range of 5 to 50 micron) by increasing the driving force of separation in order to increase the rate at which particles separate. In general, single G process are only capable of processing particles that are greater than approximately 80 micron in diameter.

Of the gravity separation processes, the spiral concentrators and circular jigs are two of the most economical due to their simplicity and use of space. They operate by flowing film separation and can either use washwater or be washwater-less. The washwater spirals separate particles more easily but can have issues with entrainment of gangue with the concentrate produced.

Froth flotation

Froth flotation is an important concentration process. This process can be used to separate any two different particles and operated by the surface chemistry of the particles. In flotation, bubbles are introduced into a pulp and the bubbles rise through the pulp. In the process, hydrophobic particles become bound to the surface of the bubbles. The driving force for this attachment is the change in the surface free energy when the attachment occurs. These bubbles rise through the slurry and are collected from the surface. To enable these particles to attach, careful consideration of the chemistry of the pulp needs to be made. These considerations include the pH, Eh and the presence of flotation reagents. The pH is important as it changes the charge of the particles surface and the pH affects the chemisorption of collectors on the surface of the particles.

The addition of flotation reagents also affects the operation of these processes. The most important chemical that is added is the collector. This chemical binds to the surface of the particles as it is a surfactant. The main considerations in this chemical is the nature of the head group and the size of the hydrocarbon chain. The hydrocarbon tail needs to be short to maximize the selectivity of the desired mineral and the headgroup dictates which minerals it attaches to.

The frothers are another important chemical addition to the pulp or slurry as it enables stable bubbles to be formed. This is important as if the bubble coalesce, minerals fall off their surface. The bubbles however should not be too stable as this prevents easy transportation and dewatering of the concentrate formed. The mechanism of these frothers is not completely known and further research into their mechanisms is being performed.

Depressants and activators are used to selectively separate one mineral from another. Depressants inhibit the flotation of one mineral or minerals while activators enable the flotation of others. Examples of these include CN−, used to depress all sulfides but galena and this depressant is believed to operate by changing the solubility of chemisorbed and physisorbed collectors on sulfides. This theory originates from Russia. An example of an activator is Cu2+ ions, used for the flotation of sphalerite.

There are a number of cells able to be used for the flotation of minerals. these include flotation columns and mechanical flotation cells. The flotation columns are used for finer minerals and typically have a higher grade and lower recovery of minerals than mechanical flotation cells. The cells in use at the moment can exceed 300 m3. This is done as they are cheaper per unit volume than smaller cells, but they are not able to be controlled as easily as smaller cells.

This process was invented in the 19th century in Australia. It was used to recover a sphalerite concentrate from tailings, produced using gravity concentration. Further improvements have come from Australia in the form of the Jameson Cell, developed at the University of Newcastle, Australia. This operated by the use of a plunging jet that generates fine bubbles. These fine bubbles have a higher kinetic energy and as such they can be used for the flotation of fine grained minerals, such as those produced by the isamill.

Staged flotation reactors (SFRs) split the flotation process into 3 defined stages per cell and are becoming increasingly more common in use as they require much less energy, air and installation space.

Electrostatic separation
There are two main types of electrostatic separators. These work in similar ways, but the forces applied to the particles are different and these forces are gravity and electrostatic attraction. The two types are electrodynamic separators (or high tension rollers) or electrostatic separators. In high tension rollers, particles are charged by a corona discharge. This charges the particles that subsequently travel on a drum. The conducting particles lose their charge to the drum and are removed from the drum with centripetal acceleration. Electrostatic plate separators work by passing a stream of particles past a charged anode. The conductors lose electrons to the plate and are pulled away from the other particles due to the induced attraction to the anode. These separators are used for particles between 75 and 250 micron and for efficient separation to occur, the particles need to be dry, have a close size distribution and uniform in shape. Of these considerations, one of the most important is the water content of the particles. This is important as a layer of moisture on the particles will render the non-conductors as conductors as the layer of the water is conductive.

Electrostatic plate separators are usually used for streams that have small conductors and coarse non-conductors. The high tension rollers are usually used for streams that have coarse conductors and fine non-conductors.

These separators are commonly used for separating mineral sands, an example of one of these mineral processing plants is the CRL processing plant at Pinkenba in Brisbane Queensland. In this plant, zircon, rutile and ilmenite are separated from the silica gangue. In this plant, the separation is performed in a number of stages with roughers, cleaners, scavengers and recleaners.

Magnetic separation
Magnetic separation is a process in which magnetically susceptible material is extracted from a mixture using a magnetic force. This separation technique can be useful in mining iron as it is attracted to a magnet. In mines where wolframite was mixed with cassiterite, such as South Crofty and East Pool mine in Cornwall or with bismuth such as at the Shepherd and Murphy mine in Moina, Tasmania, magnetic separation was used to separate the ores. At these mines a device called a Wetherill's Magnetic Separator (invented by John Price Wetherill, 1844–1906)[1] was used. In this machine the raw ore, after calcination was fed onto a moving belt which passed underneath two pairs of electromagnets under which further belts ran at right angles to the feed belt. The first pair of electromagnets was weakly magnetised and served to draw off any iron ore present. The second pair were strongly magnetised and attracted the wolframite, which is weakly magnetic. These machines were capable of treating 10 tons of ore a day. This process of separating magnetic substances from the non-magnetic substances in a mixture with the help of a magnet is called magnetic separation..

This process operates by moving particles in a magnetic field. The force experienced in the magnetic field is given by the equation f=m/k.H.dh/dx. with k=magnetic susceptibility, H-magnetic field strength, and dh/dx being the magnetic field gradient. As seen in this equation, the separation can be driven in two ways, either through a gradient in a magnetic field or the strength of a magnetic field. The different driving forces are used in the different concentrators. These can be either with water or without. Like the spirals, washwater aids in the separation of the particles while increases the entrainment of the gangue in the concentrate.

Automated Ore Sorting

Modern, automated sorting applies optical sensors (visible spectrum, near infrared, X-ray, ultraviolet), that can be coupled with electrical conductivity and magnetic susceptibility sensors, to control the mechanical separation of ore into two or more categories on an individual rock by rock basis. Also new sensors have been developed which exploit material properties such as electrical conductivity, magnetization, molecular structure and thermal conductivity. Sensor based sorting has found application in the processing of nickel, gold, copper, coal
and diamonds.

Dewatering

Dewatering is an important process in mineral processing. The purpose of dewatering is to remove water absorbed by the particles which increases the pulp density. This is done for a number of reasons, specifically, to enable ore handling and concentrates to be transported easily, allow further processing to occur and to dispose of the gangue. The water extracted from the ore by dewatering is recirculated for plant operations after being sent to a water treatment plant. The main processes that are used in dewatering include dewatering screens, sedimentation, filtering, and thermal drying. These processes increase in difficulty and cost as the particle size decreases.

Dewatering screens operate by passing particles over a screen. The particles pass over the screen while the water passes through the apertures in the screen. This process is only viable for coarse ores that have a close size distribution as the apertures can allow small particles to pass through.

Sedimentation operates by passing water into a large thickener or clarifier. In these devices, the particles settle out of the slurry under the effects of gravity, or centripetal forces. These are limited by the surface chemistry of the particles and the size of the particles. To aid in the sedimentation process, flocculants and coagulants are added to reduce the repulsive forces between the particles. This repulsive force is due to the double layer formed on the surface of the particles. The flocculants work by binding multiple particles together while the coagulants work by reducing the thickness of the charged layer on the outside of the particle. After thickening, slurry is often stored in ponds or impoundments. Alternatively, it can pumped into a belt press or membrane filter press to recycle process water and create stackable, dry filter cake, or "tailings".

Thermal drying is usually used for fine particles and to remove low water content in the particles. Some common processes include rotary dryers, fluidised beds, spray driers, hearth dryers and rotary tray dryers. This process is usually expensive to operate due to the fuel requirement of the dryers.

Other processes
Many mechanical plants also incorporate hydrometallurgical or pyrometallurgical processes as part of an extractive metallurgical operation. Geometallurgy is a branch of extractive metallurgy that combines mineral processing with the geologic sciences. This includes the study of oil agglomeration

A number of auxiliary materials handling operations are also considered a branch of mineral processing such as storage (as in bin design), conveying, sampling, weighing, slurry transport, and pneumatic transport.

The efficiency and efficacy of many processing techniques are influenced by upstream activities such as mining method and blending.

Conferences

European Metallurgical Conference (EMC)
EMC, the European Metallurgical Conference has developed to the most important networking business event dedicated to the non-ferrous metals industry in Europe. From the start of the conference sequence in 2001 at Friedrichshafen it was host to some of most relevant metallurgists from all countries of the world. The conference is held every two years by invitation of GDMB Society of Metallurgists and Miners and is particularly directed to metal producers, plant manufactures, equipment suppliers and service providers as well as members of universities and consultants.

See also
 Ball mill
 Dartmoor tin-mining
 Science of Flotation
 Rocker box

Notes

References
 Dobby, G.S., and Finch, J.A., 1991, Column Flotation: A Selected Review, Part II, 4(7-11) 911-923
 Finch, J.A., 1995, Column Flotation: A Selected Review-Part IV: Novel Flotation Devices, Minerals Engineering, 8(6), 587-602
 Miettinen, T, Ralston, J., and Fornasiero, D., The Limits of Fine Particle Flotation, Minerals Engineering, 23, 420-437 (2010)
 Nguyen, A.V., Ralston, J., Schulze, H.S., 1988, On modelling of bubble–particle attachment probability in flotation, Int. J. Min. Proc., 53(4) 225-249
 Probstein, R. F. (2003) Physicochemical Hydrodynamics: An introduction, Hoboken, New Jersey, John Wiley & Sons, Inc., 141–142.
 Ralston, J. Fornasiero, D., Hayes, R., 1999, Bubble Particle Attachment and Detachment in Flotation, Int. J. Min. Proc., 56(1-4) 133-164
Wills, B.A., Finch, J. (2015): Wills' Mineral Processing Technology, An Introduction to the Practical Aspects of Ore Treatment and Mineral Recovery; 8th Edition, 512 pp,

Sources
 Various articles in J. Day & R. F. Tylecote, Metals in the Industrial Revolution (Institute of Metals, London 1991).

 
Metallurgical processes